The name Lorraine has been used for three tropical cyclones in the Eastern Pacific Ocean:

 Tropical Storm Lorraine (1966)
 Hurricane Lorraine (1970)
 Tropical Storm Lorraine (1974)

Pacific hurricane set index articles